Ectropis distinctaria is a moth of the  family Geometridae. It is found in Mauritius.

The wingspan is about 33 mm.

This species is close to Ectropis herbuloti Orhant, 2003, which had been confused with E.distinctaria until 2003

References

Boarmiini
Moths described in 1915
Moths of Mauritius
Moths of Réunion